Coline M. Campbell (born 26 September 1940) is a former member of the House of Commons of Canada in the 30th (1974–1979), 32nd (1980–1984) and 34th (1988–1993) Canadian Parliaments. Campbell was the first woman from Nova Scotia elected to the House of Commons.

Before politics
Prior to entering politics, Campbell was a teacher and lawyer.

Political career
Campbell was first elected in the 1974 federal election at the South Western Nova electoral district for the Liberal Party. She served as a backbench supporter of Prime Minister Pierre Trudeau's government. After her first term in Parliament, she was defeated by Charles E. Haliburton of the Progressive Conservative (PC) Party in the 1979 federal election; following electoral redistribution in 1976, her riding had been renamed South West Nova.

Following the short-lived Progressive Conservative minority government of Joe Clark, she was re-elected at South West Nova in 1980. She served as a government-side backbencher under Pierre Trudeau and John Turner until the 1984 Canadian federal election, when she lost the seat again to PC challenger Gerald Comeau.

Her last term in Parliament began with her second comeback in the 1988 federal election. She served in opposition under John Turner and Jean Chrétien. She did not seek another term in Parliament after this and left federal politics as of the 1993 federal election.

Electoral Record

References

External links
 

1940 births
Liberal Party of Canada MPs
Living people
Members of the House of Commons of Canada from Nova Scotia
Canadian people of Scottish descent
Women members of the House of Commons of Canada
People from Digby County, Nova Scotia
Women in Nova Scotia politics